Aleksandr Soldatenkov (born 1887, date of death unknown) was a Russian Empire fencer. He competed in the individual and team épée events at the 1912 Summer Olympics.

References

1887 births
Year of death missing
Male fencers from the Russian Empire
Olympic competitors for the Russian Empire
Fencers at the 1912 Summer Olympics